Sinirli is a village in Manisa in Turkey's Aegean Region. The village is 50 km away from the centre of the city. The people of the village immigrated from Yugoslavia. The people of the village were called Muhacir which means Emigrator.

Villages in Manisa Province